Roberts Hall can refer to:

Australia
 Roberts Hall, of Monash University

United States
 Roberts Hall (Ithaca, New York), at Cornell University

Architectural disambiguation pages